The Ludi Piscatorii was a Roman holiday celebrated on 7 June in the 3rd century BC in honor of Father Tiber. The holiday was celebrated by the fishermen of Rome; the celebration was directed by the Praetor.  All fish that were caught on this day were sacrificed by fire at the Temple of Vulcan

References

Ancient Roman culture
Ancient Roman festivals
June observances